The following is a list of events affecting Philippine television in 1994. Events listed include television show debuts, finales, cancellations, and channel launches, closures and rebrandings, as well as information about controversies and carriage disputes.

Events

May 28 - IBC-13 launches the slogan "Pinoy ang Dating".
October 1 - New Vision 9 reverted to RPN and adopted the station tagline "RPN, The Network".

Premieres

Unknown

 Remi: Nobody's Boy on ABS-CBN 2
 Bayan Ko, Sagot Ko on ABS-CBN 2
 Tatak Pilipino: Bagong Yugto on ABS-CBN 2
 Value Vision on ABS-CBN 2
 One on One on IBC 13
 Buhay Kartero on IBC 13
 Ating Alamin on IBC 13
 Mikee on GMA 7
 Billy Bilyonaryo on GMA 7
 The 700 Club Asia on GMA 7
 In Touch with Charles Stanley on GMA 7
 Sky Ranger Gavan on ABC 5
 WWE Raw on ABC 5
 Hard Hat on ABC 5
 Quantum Leap on ABC 5
 Stars on 5 on ABC 5
 Agri Link on ABC 5
 B na B: Baliw na Baliw on ABC 5
 Bodies and Motion on ABC 5
 Rock and Roll 2000 on ABC 5
 Value Vision on ABC 5
 Video Hot Tracks on ABC 5
 Blow by Blow on PTV 4
 For Kids Only on ABS-CBN 2
 Batong Buhay on GMA 7
 Angelito on GMA 7
 Gapo on RPN 9
 Miranova on RPN 9
 Chibugan Na! on RPN 9
 Barangay U.S.: Unang Sigaw on RPN 9
 D'on Po Sa Amin on RPN 9
 Ganito Kami Ngayon, O Ano Ha on RPN 9
 Newslight on RPN 9
 Beauty School Plus on RPN 9
 Actually, Yun Na! on RPN 9
 J2J on RPN 9
 The Doctor Is In on RPN 9
 Ikaw ang Mahal Ko on PTV 4
 Sportacular Asia on PTV 4
 Batibot on PTV 4
 Hutch The Honeybee on ABC 5
 Pollyanna on ABC 5
 Julio at Julia: Kambal ng Tadhana on ABS-CBN 2

Returning or renamed programs

Programs transferring networks

Finales
 April 1: IBC NewsBreak on IBC 13
 August 31: Straight from the Shoulder on GMA 7
 September 30:
 Anna Luna on ABS-CBN 2
 The Hour Updates on RPN 9
 November 24: Kate en Boogie on GMA 7

Unknown dates
 September: Straight from the Shoulder on GMA 7
 November: Viewpoint on GMA 7

Unknown

 The Global Update on ABC 5
 17 Bernard Club on ABC 5
 Vina on ABC 5
 We R Family on ABC 5
 Tondominium on ABC 5
 Alabang Girls on ABC 5
 Late Night with Edu on ABC 5
 Rock and Roll 2000 on ABC 5
 The Edu Manzano Show on ABC 5
 Batibot on ABS-CBN 2
 Eh Kasi Bata! on ABS-CBN 2
 Bukang Liwayway on ABS-CBN 2
 Gillette World Sport Special on ABS-CBN 2
 Remi: Nobody's Boy on ABS-CBN 2
 One on One on IBC 13
 Heartwatch on IBC 13
 Buhay Kartero on IBC 13
 Pasikatan sa 13 on IBC 13
 Shaider on IBC 13
 Betty and the Beast on GMA 7
 Modern Romance Sa Telebisyon on GMA 7
 Rated PangBayan: Pugad Baboy sa TV on GMA 7
 NBC Nightly News on GMA 7
 The World Tomorrow on GMA 7
 It's A Date on RPN 9
 Mega Cinema Review on RPN 9
 Ako... Babae on RPN 9
 Gapo on RPN 9
 Tanglaw ng Buhay on RPN 9
 ATM: Anette, Tonyboy & Maria on RPN 9
 D'on Po Sa Amin on RPN 9
 Ganito Kami Ngayon, O Ano Ha on RPN 9
 Mommy Ko si Tita on RPN 9
 Wats UP sa Barangay on RPN 9
 Beauty School with Ricky Reyes on RPN 9
 The Doctor Is In on RPN 9
 Diwa ng Katotohanan on PTV 4
 Usapang Kongreso on PTV 4
 PTV Weekend Report on PTV 4
 WomanWatch with Nikki Coseteng: It's About Time on PTV 4
 Sky Ranger Gavan on PTV 4
 Hutch The Honeybee on ABC 5
 Pollyanna on ABC 5
 Julio at Julia: Kambal ng Tadhana on ABS-CBN 2

Channels

Launches
 October 6 - Cartoon Network (Southeast Asia)

Births
 January 6 – MJ Cayabyab, actor and singer
 January 7 – Jessica Marasigan, dancer, beauty queen, TV host
 January 11 – Ritz Azul, actress
 March 23 - Patrick Sugui, actor and TV Host
 April 6 
 Jasmine Curtis-Smith, actress
 Yesh Burce, actress
 April 16 – Angelica Jane Yap, actress and model
 April 27 – Elmo Magalona, actor and singer
 May 17 – Julie Anne San Jose, actress and singer
 June 13 – Hopia Legaspi, actress
 June 20 – Kyra Custodio, actress
 July 9 – Donnalyn Bartolome, actress and singer
 July 30 – Isabelle de Leon, actress and singer
 August 3 – Sarah Carlos, actress and courtside reporter of NCAA on ABS-CBN Sports and studied at San Beda College
 August 14 - Kim Rodriguez, actress
 August 16 - Tippy Dos Santos, actress and singer
 August 23 - Mark Neumann, actor
 September 22 - Avery Paraiso, actor and model
 October 31 - Jackque Gonzaga, dancer
 November 2 - Denise Barbacena, singer and actress
 November 20 - Kristofer Martin, actor
 November 26 
 Noven Belleza, singer
 Yves Flores, actor
 December 7 – Myrtle Sarrosa, actress and former courtside reporter of National Collegiate Athletic Association on S+A
 December 14 – Joshua Dionisio, actor
 December 29 - Kristel Fulgar, actress

Deaths
 September 5 – Louie Beltran (b. April 4, 1936), broadcast journalist and newspaper columnist

See also
1994 in television

 
Television in the Philippines by year
Philippine television-related lists